Marvin Clement Bartley (born 4 July 1986) is an English professional football coach and former player, who is currently the manager of Scottish League One club Queen of the South. Early in his career, Bartley played for English non-league clubs Burnham, Hayes, Didcot Town and Hampton & Richmond Borough. He broke into the professional leagues in 2007 with AFC Bournemouth, where he made over 100 Football League appearances. Soon after Bournemouth manager Eddie Howe moved to Burnley in 2011, Bartley followed Howe to Turf Moor.

Bartley fell out of favour at Burnley after Howe returned to Bournemouth in October 2012. He initially moved on loan to Leyton Orient, then joined Orient on a permanent basis after he was released by Burnley in January 2014. Bartley left Orient in the summer of 2015 and signed for Scottish club Hibernian. He helped Hibernian win the Scottish Cup in 2016 and promotion in 2017. After his contract with Hibernian expired in May 2019, Bartley signed for Livingston. He started coaching with Livingston and retired from playing in 2022. 

He was appointed manager of Queen of the South in January 2023.

Career

Early and non-league career
Born in Reading, Berkshire, Bartley started his career with his hometown club, Reading, playing in the youth setup before being released as a teenager. Bartley then joined the Hayes Football Education Development Opportunity (FEDO) program to help develop his skills, of which he graduated from in 2004. He then joined Southern Football League side Burnham where he played alongside his two brothers, Mark and Michael. He made his début for Burnham on 21 August 2004, coming on as a substitute in a 1–0 defeat to Evesham United. His final appearance came in a 3–2 defeat to Sutton Coldfield Town on 30 October. He made a total of eight appearances for the Blues, without scoring.

Bartley then made a swift return to his former club, Conference South side Hayes during the season along with his brother Mark. His début came on 12 February 2005, in a 3–2 away win over Sutton United. He finished the season as a first-team regular making a total of eight appearances for Hayes in the 2004–05 season as they finished mid-table. In May 2005, he signed a new two-year contract to stay at the club. His first appearance of the 2005–06 season was on 13 August 2005, in a 1–0 win over newly promoted Eastleigh. His first career goal came on 10 September, when he scored the second in a 2–0 victory over Bishop's Stortford. His second goal came on 12 November, when he scored the winner in a 2–1 away win at Carshalton Athletic. His final goal of the season and for Hayes came on 11 February 2006, when he scored the leveller in a 1–1 draw with Bognor Regis Town. Bartley remained a first team regular during the season making a total of 40 appearances, scoring three goals as they narrowly avoided relegation. His first game of the 2006–07 season came on 12 August 2006, in a 3–1 defeat to Histon. His final appearance for Hayes was on 12 September, when he came on as a substitute in a 3–2 defeat to Bognor Regis Town.

In September 2006, Bartley joined Southern League side Didcot Town. He scored on his début, coming off the bench to score the second in a 2–2 draw with Windsor & Eton on 24 September. Bartley made a total of two appearances for Didcot before signing for Isthmian League side Hampton & Richmond Borough on a free transfer in October 2006. His début came on 17 October, in a 2–2 draw away at Heybridge Swifts. He remained a first-team regular and on 24 April 2007 he made his final appearance for Hampton in the reverse fixture to Heybridge, which again finished 2–2. He made a total of 25 appearances for the Beavers as they were crowned champions and gained promotion to the Conference South.

AFC Bournemouth
Bartley was close to joining Football League Two side Milton Keynes Dons after spending a week on trial, until manager Martin Allen departed for Leicester City. In the summer of 2007, Bartley joined Football League One side AFC Bournemouth on a two-week trial, playing in pre-season friendlies against Hamworthy United, Weymouth and Southampton. On 23 July, he signed a one-year professional contract after the successful trial, becoming the fourth new arrival. Prior to joining Bournemouth he had been combining his semi-professional career with installing double glazing for The Splash Group in Reading. He made his début for the Cherries on 1 December 2007, in the FA Cup second round defeat away to Millwall, coming on as a late substitute for Jo Kuffour. His league début came a week later where he again featured as a substitute, coming on for Jem Karacan in a 3–1 defeat to Tranmere Rovers at Prenton Park. On 26 January 2008, Bartley made his first start for Bournemouth in a 3–1 away win at Port Vale. He continued to be a first team regular in the team, scoring his first professional goal in a 2–2 draw with Cheltenham Town on 23 February. His final appearance of the season was on 3 May 2008, a 1–1 draw with Carlisle United as Bournemouth were relegated to League Two. Bartley made a total of 21 appearances in all competitions in the 2007–08 season, scoring one goal.

In December 2010, it was revealed that Bartley was subject of interest from AFC Wimbledon, Stevenage, AS Nancy, Havant & Waterlooville, Leeds United and Leicester City.

Burnley
Following the move of Bournemouth manager Eddie Howe to Burnley just two weeks later on 30 January 2011, Burnley submitted a bid believed to be in the region of £350,000 for Bartley. Despite Bournemouth chairman Eddie Mitchell having previously stated that no Bournemouth players were leaving in the January transfer window, it was claimed by Mitchell, that Bartley forced the move through by refusing to play for the Cherries again if the bid was rejected. This was denied by Bartley in an online video interview, on 2 April 2020. As a result, a fee was agreed and Bartley became a Claret.

Under Howe, Bartley was a regular feature in match day squads for the rest of 2011, and he scored his first goal for Burnley against Blackpool in a 3–1 home victory, scoring the third and final goal of the match. Despite initially regularly featuring, Bartley soon found himself deployed more from the bench than in a starting role, losing his place to the more established midfield three of Dean Marney, Chris McCann and Brian Stock. The return of Howe to Bournemouth in October 2012 and the subsequent appointment of Sean Dyche further pushed Bartley away from a regular place in the squad.

In November 2012, the Jamaica Football Federation reported that Bartley had shown interest playing for Jamaica (the "Reggae Boyz") and that he was in the pool of players eligible for selection.

On 30 January 2014, Bartley terminated his contract with Burnley by mutual consent.

Leyton Orient
After falling out favour at Burnley, Bartley joined League One side Leyton Orient on an initial one-month loan deal on 1 August 2013. Following their excellent start to the 2013–14 season, his loan deal was extended. Bartley then joined Leyton Orient on a permanent basis in January 2014.

Hibernian
After eighteen months at Leyton Orient, Bartley joined Scottish Championship side Hibernian on 17 July 2015 on a two-year deal. Bartley was an unused substitute as Hibernian won the 2016 Scottish Cup Final, their first win in the competition for 114 years.

On 17 September 2016, Bartley was sent off against Ayr United, but had his red card overturned the following week. He was dismissed again on 15 October, against Raith Rovers, but this was also downgraded to a yellow card. Bartley explained that in order for the card to be rescinded completely, he would have had to miss a day of training to go to an appeal, which he was not willing to do. After helping the club win promotion to the Scottish Premiership in 2016–17, he signed a two-year contract with Hibs in May 2017.

Livingston
In May 2019, Bartley signed a pre-contract agreement with Livingston. He scored his first goal for Livingston in a 1–1 draw with Hearts on 4 December 2019. Ahead of the 2020–21 season, he was named as Livingston's club captain. In September 2020, Bartley was named as the new manager of Livingston’s reserve team, assisted by fellow players Efe Ambrose and Gary Maley. 

Bartley became assistant manager to David Martindale in May 2021, replacing Liam Fox. He retired from playing at the end of the 2021–22 season, as the playing part of his contract with Livingston came to an end.

Managerial career

Queen of the South 
On 7 January 2023, Bartley was named as the new manager of Scottish League One club Queen of the South.

Media work
During the 2019–20 season Bartley appeared as a pundit for coverage of Scottish football by BBC Scotland and BT Sport. In June 2020, Bartley appeared in a special podcast panel discussing his experiences of racism in football with A View from the Terrace host Craig Fowler.

Personal life
Bartley was born in England and is of Jamaican descent. He was fined £400 in November 2017 after he was found guilty of threatening a woman.

In April 2021, Bartley expressed fears that a footballer may one day commit suicide due to racist abuse sent over social media platforms.

Statistics

Playing career

A.  The "Other" column constitutes appearances and goals (including those as a substitute) in the Football League Trophy, Scottish Challenge Cup, UEFA Europa League and play-offs.

Managerial record

Honours

Player
Hibernian
Scottish Cup: 2015–16
Scottish Championship: 2016–17
Scottish League Cup runner up 2015-16 

Livingston
Scottish League Cup runner-up: 2020–21

Notes

References

External links
Official AFC Bournemouth Profile

1986 births
Living people
Sportspeople from Reading, Berkshire
Association football midfielders
English footballers
English people of Jamaican descent
Reading F.C. players
Hayes F.C. players
Hampton & Richmond Borough F.C. players
AFC Bournemouth players
Burnley F.C. players
English Football League players
Didcot Town F.C. players
Leyton Orient F.C. players
Hibernian F.C. players
Burnham F.C. players
Southern Football League players
Isthmian League players
Scottish Professional Football League players
Livingston F.C. players
Footballers from Berkshire
Livingston F.C. non-playing staff
Scottish Professional Football League managers
Queen of the South F.C. managers
English football managers